The Server Efficiency Rating Tool (SERT) is a performance analysis tool that is specifically designed to addresses the requirements of the Environmental Protection Agency's ENERGY STAR for Servers v2.0 specification.
The SERT Beta 1 was introduced in September, 2011.

Several SPEC member companies contributed to the development of the SERT including AMD, Dell, Fujitsu, HPE, Intel, IBM, and Microsoft.

References

External links
 

Benchmarks (computing)
Evaluation of computers

bs:SPEC
de:Standard Performance Evaluation Corporation
es:SPEC
ja:Standard Performance Evaluation Corporation
pl:SPEC (organizacja)